Michel-Jean Simons (born 1762) was a supplier to the French army.

On December 24, 1797, he married Mademoiselle Lange. Among the witnesses of their marriage was François de Neufchâteau, one of five members of the French Directory.

He was the owner of three sugar estates in the West Indies.

References

1762 births
1833 deaths